Kaveh may refer to:

Kaveh (name), both a given name and surname
Kaveh (magazine), a political and literary journal on the Iranian identity (1916–1922)
 Kaveh (periodical)
Kaveh the blacksmith, figure in Iranian mythology

Places
Kaveh, alternate name of Rafi, Iran, a city in Khuzestan Province, Iran
Kaveh Badam, a village in Kohgiluyeh and Boyer-Ahmad Province, Iran
Kaveh-ye Olya, a village in Lorestan Province, Iran
Kaveh-ye Olya (Deh Sefid), a village in Lorestan Province, Iran
Kaveh-ye Sofla, a village in Lorestan Province, Iran
Kaveh-ye Vosta, a village in Lorestan Province, Iran
Kaveh Industrial City, a village in Markazi Province, Iran

Sport
Kaveh Tehran BC, a basketball team in Iran

See also
Kav